Mangochi Airport  is an airport serving the town of Mangochi in Southern Region, Malawi.

See also

 List of airports in Malawi
 Transport in Malawi

References

 Google Earth

External links
 OpenStreetMap - Mangochi
 OurAirports - Mangochi
 Mangochi

Airports in Malawi